The Hayne–Mannah Cup was a rugby league test match played between Fiji and Lebanon on Sunday, 19 October 2014.

Background
The fixture was in honour of Parramatta Eels players, Jarryd Hayne and Tim Mannah, who both have Fijian and Lebanese heritage respectively. Fiji won the test match by 40-28 after leading 22-12 at half-time. Fiji's James Storer won the man of the match award, scoring one try in the match.

Squads

Fiji
Coach:  Rick Stone

Lebanon
Coach:  Darren Maroon

Match details

References

International rugby league competitions hosted by Australia
2014 in rugby league
Rugby league in Fiji
Rugby league in Lebanon
Hayne/Mannah Cup
Hayne/Mannah Cup